The second Rutte cabinet, also called the Rutte–Asscher cabinet, was the executive branch of the Government of the Netherlands from 5 November 2012 until 26 October 2017. The cabinet was formed by the conservative-liberal People's Party for Freedom and Democracy (VVD) and the social-democratic Labour Party (PvdA) after the election of 2012. The cabinet was a centrist grand coalition and had a slim majority in the House of Representatives. VVD Leader Mark Rutte served as Prime Minister; prominent PvdA politician Lodewijk Asscher, a former alderman of Amsterdam, served as Deputy Prime Minister and Minister of Social Affairs and Employment.

The cabinet served in the middle of the 2010s. Domestically, it had to deal with the Malaysia Airlines Flight 17 disaster, which was shot down by a surface-to-air missile killing 193 Dutch citizens on board, while internationally, climate change was a major point of attention. The cabinet suffered several major internal conflicts such as multiple cabinet resignations, including those of two Justice Ministers. The cabinet completed its entire term, and was succeeded by the third Rutte cabinet following the 2017 election. With  in office, it is the longest serving post-war cabinet in the Netherlands.

Cabinet members

Changes
On 6 December 2012, just 31 days after taking office, State Secretary for Economic Affairs Co Verdaas (PvdA) resigned after he was accused of making inappropriate declarations when he served as a Member of the Provincial-Executive of Gelderland. He was replaced as State Secretary for Economic Affairs by former State Secretary for Education, Culture and Science Sharon Dijksma (PvdA) on 18 December 2012.

On 17 October 2014 Minister of Foreign Affairs Frans Timmermans (PvdA) resigned after he was nominated as the next European Commissioner succeeding Neelie Kroes. He was replaced as Minister of Foreign Affairs by Special Representative of the Secretary-General for the United Nations in Mali and former Minister for Development Cooperation Bert Koenders (PvdA).

On 10 March 2015 Minister of Security and Justice Ivo Opstelten (VVD) and State Secretary for Security and Justice Fred Teeven (VVD) resigned after it was discovered that Fred Teeven when he served as a Prosecutor authorized the return of 4.7 million guilders to convicted drugs dealer Cees H. in 2000 without the knowledge of his superior or the tax office.

On 4 October 2017 Minister of Defence Jeanine Hennis-Plasschaert (VVD) resigned following a critical report by the Dutch Safety Board into the investigation of the accidental deaths of two Army soldiers who died following the use of old ammunition during a Mortar test during the United Nations Multidimensional Integrated Stabilization Mission in Mali. She was replaced as Minister of Defence by State Secretary for Security and Justice Klaas Dijkhoff (VVD) who served out the remaining three weeks before the installation of the new cabinet.

Trivia
 Four cabinet members had previous experience as scholars and professors: Lodewijk Asscher (intellectual property law), Ronald Plasterk (molecular genetics), Jet Bussemaker (political science) and Klaas Dijkhoff (jurisprudence).

References

External links
Official

  Kabinet-Rutte II Parlement & Politiek
  Kabinet-Rutte-Asscher Rijksoverheid

Cabinets of the Netherlands
2012 establishments in the Netherlands
2017 disestablishments in the Netherlands
Cabinets established in 2012
Cabinets disestablished in 2017
Grand coalition governments